Esporte Clube Poções, commonly known as Poções, is a Brazilian football club from Poções, Bahia state. They competed in the Série C and in the Copa do Brasil once.

History
The club was founded on July 22, 1985. They won the Campeonato Baiano Second Level in 1993. The club competed in the Copa do Brasil in 2000, when they were eliminated in the Second Round by Cortiiba, and competed in the Série C in 2007, when they were eliminated in the First Stage of the competition.

Achievements
 Campeonato Baiano Second Level:
 Winners (1): 1993

Stadium
Esporte Clube Poções play their home games at Estádio Heraldo Curvelo, nicknamed Heraldão. The stadium has a maximum capacity of 8,000 people.

References

Association football clubs established in 1985
Football clubs in Bahia
1985 establishments in Brazil